Nyon railway station is a railway station in the municipality of Nyon, in the Swiss canton of Vaud. It is an intermediate stop on the standard gauge Lausanne–Geneva line of Swiss Federal Railways and the southern terminus of the  gauge Nyon–St-Cergue–Morez line of the Chemin de fer Nyon–St-Cergue–Morez.

Layout and connections 
The Lausanne–Geneva line has three tracks ( 1–3) served by a side platform and an island platform. An island platform for the  gauge Nyon–St-Cergue–Morez line is located underground, beneath the Route St-Cergue. This platform has two tracks, Nos. 21–22. CarPostal Suisse,  (TPN), and Alsa Bustours Gex operate bus services from the station.

Services 
 the following services stop at Nyon:

On weekends, hourly service to Geneva Airport.

References

External links 
 
 

Railway stations in the canton of Vaud
Swiss Federal Railways stations